Stefan Edberg defeated Paul Haarhuis 6–3, 6–2 to win the 1994 Qatar Open singles competition. Boris Becker was the defending champion.

Seeds

  Pete Sampras (first round)
  Michael Stich (second round)
  Stefan Edberg (champion)
  Goran Ivanišević (semifinals)
  Marc-Kevin Goellner (first round)
  Javier Sánchez (first round)
  Andrei Cherkasov (first round)
  Magnus Larsson (first round)

Draw

Finals

Section 1

Section 2

External links
 1994 Qatar Open Main Singles Draw

Singles